Abdullahi (full name: Abdullahi Maje Karofi dan Dabo) was an Emir of Kano who reigned from 1855 to 1883.

Biography in the Kano Chronicle
Below is a biography of Abdullahi from Palmer's 1908 English translation of the Kano Chronicle.

References

Emirs of Kano
19th-century rulers in Africa